Charlotte Walter (born 8 October 1951 in Aarau) is a Swiss former figure skater who competed in ladies' singles. She won the gold medal at the Swiss Figure Skating Championships for five straight years, from 1968 to 1972. She finished in the top ten at three ISU Championships — 1971 Europeans in Zurich, Switzerland; 1971 Worlds in Lyon, France; and 1972 Europeans in Gothenburg, Sweden. She placed 22nd at the 1968 Winter Olympics in Grenoble and 9th at the 1972 Winter Olympics in Sapporo.

Competitive highlights

References

Swiss female single skaters
1951 births
Olympic figure skaters of Switzerland
Figure skaters at the 1968 Winter Olympics
Figure skaters at the 1972 Winter Olympics
Living people
People from Aarau
Sportspeople from Aargau